Hannes Wolf may refer to:

 Hannes Wolf (football manager) (born 1981), German football manager
 Hannes Wolf (footballer) (born 1999), Austrian footballer

See also
 Hanns Wolf (1894–1968), German composer and pianist